The 1941 Utah State Aggies football team was an American football team that represented Utah State Agricultural College in the Mountain States Conference (MSC) during the 1941 college football season. In their 23rd season under head coach Dick Romney, the Aggies compiled a 0–8 record (0–6 against MSC opponents), finished in last place in the MSC, and were outscored by a total of 153 to 46.

Schedule

References

Utah State
Utah State Aggies football seasons
College football winless seasons
Utah State Aggies football